Events from the year 1992 in Denmark.

Incumbents
 Monarch - Margrethe II
 Prime minister - Poul Schlüter

Events
 30 May - The Danish national football team are entered into the European Championships in Sweden as Yugoslavia, who beat them to qualification six months prior, are banned from the competition due to United Nations sanctions resulting from the nation's political problems.
 11 June - Denmark's Euro 92 campaign begins with a goalless draw against England in Malmö.
 14 June - Denmark's Euro 92 dream is thrown into doubt when they lose 1–0 to the host nation in Solna.
 17 June - Denmark beat France 2–1 in their final group game (with goals from Henrik Larsen and Lars Elstrup) in Malmö, and reach the semi finals thanks to England's 2–1 defeat by Sweden.
 21 June 21–22 - A European Council was held in Bella Center, Copenhagen leading to the formulation of the Copenhagen Criteria.
 26 June - Denmark win the Euro 92 final with a 2–0 win over Germany in Stockholm. It is Denmark's first major international trophy.

Undated

The arts

Architecture

Film
 Lars von Trier and Peter Aalbæk Jensen founds Zentropa.
 May – Bille August's film The Best Intentions wins the Palme d'Or at the 45th Cannes Film Festival.

Literature

Music

Sports
 25 July – 9 August – Denmark at the 1992 Summer Olympics in Barcelona: 1 gold medal, 1 silver medal and 4 bronze medals.

Badminton
 1721 March  Thomas Lund and Pernille Dupont win gold in mixed double at the 1992 All England Open Badminton Championships.
 12–18 April – With four gold medals, six silver medals and one bronze medal, Denmark finishes as the best nation at the 13th European Badminton Championships in Glasgow, Scotland.

Cycling
 March – Rolf Sørensen wins the Tirreno–Adriatico cycle race in Italy.
 September – Rolf Sørensen wins the Paris–Brussels road cycling race.
 Danny Clark (AUS) and Urs Freuler (SUI) win the Six Days of Copenhagen sox-day track cycling race.

Football
 10 –26 June – Denmark participates at UEFA Euro 1992.
 22 June - Henrik Larsen scores twice as Denmark draw 2–2 with Holland in the Euro 92 semi-final in Gothenburg, and a victory in the penalty shoot-out takes them to the final.
 26 June - Denmark becomes European football champions at UEFA Euro 1992, winning the final 2–0 against Germany. The goals come from John Jensen and Kim Vilfort.

Other
 4 September – Johnny Bredahl becomes super-featherweight boxing champions by defeating José Quirino in Copenhagen.

Births
 2 January – Cathrine Dufour, dressage rider
 7 January – Mark Gundelach, footballer
 25 January – Mikkel Cramer, footballer
 28 January – Simone Egeriis, singer
 14 February – Christian Eriksen, footballer
 15 February – Nicolai Boilesen, footballer
 18 February – Michael Jepsen Jensen, speedway rider
 23 February – Markus Kilsgaard, alpine skier
 22 March – Oğuzhan Aynaoğlu, footballer
 26 March – Nina Agdal, model
 14 April – Frederik Sørensen, footballer
 24 April – Nina Hollensen, rower
 3 July – Karen Barbat, tennis player
 4 July – Anis Basim Moujahid, pop singer and songwriter
 23 August – Mads Dittmer Hvilsom, footballer
 16 September – Jonas Knudsen, footballer
 5 October – Kevin Magnussen, racing driver
 9 October – Martin Hoberg Hedegaard, singer
 1 November – Mikkel Agger, footballer
 10 November – Anne Dsane Andersen, rower
 6 December – Jeppe Andersen, footballer
 18 December – Mikkel Mac, racing driver

Full date unknown
 Emma Klingenberg, orienteering competitor

Deaths
 6 January – Bent Christensen, film director (born 1929)
 15 September – Mogens Koch, architect and designer (born 1898)
 18 September – Princess Margaret of Denmark (born 1895)

See also
1992 in Danish television

References

 
Denmark
Years of the 20th century in Denmark
1990s in Denmark